Holothele is a genus of tarantulas that was first described by Ferdinand Anton Franz Karsch in 1879. Originally placed with the curtain-web spiders, it was transferred to the tarantulas in 1980.

Diagnosis 
They can be distinguished by the lack of urticating hairs, tarsus 4 being pseudo segmented. The tarsal claws own a row of teeth, and a labium with around 90 cuspules.

Species
 it contains six species, found in the West Indies and in the north of South America:
Holothele culebrae (Petrunkevitch, 1929) – Puerto Rico
Holothele denticulata (Franganillo, 1930) – Cuba
Holothele longipes (L. Koch, 1875) (type) – Panama, Venezuela, Bolivia, Trinidad and Tobago, Guyana, Suriname, French Guiana, Brazil
Holothele maddeni (Esposito & Agnarsson, 2014) - Dominican Republic
Holothele shoemakeri (Petrunkevitch, 1926) – US Virgin Islands (St. Thomas)
Holothele sulfurensis Maréchal, 2005 – Guadeloupe

In synonymy 
H. ludwigi (Strand, 1907) = Holothele longipes (L. Koch, 1875)
H. ravida (Simon, 1889) = Holothele longipes (L. Koch, 1875)
H. recta Karsch, 1879 = Holothele longipes (L. Koch, 1875)
H. rondoni (Lucas & Bücherl, 1972) = Holothele longipes (L. Koch, 1875)
H. sanguiniceps (F. O. Pickard-Cambridge, 1899) = Holothele longipes (L. Koch, 1875)

Transferred to other genera

See also
 List of Theraphosidae species

References

Theraphosidae genera
Spiders of Central America
Spiders of South America
Spiders of the Caribbean
Taxa named by Ferdinand Karsch
Theraphosidae